Marie de Garis MBE (née Le Messurier; 15 June 1910 – 10 August 2010) was a Guernsey author and lexicographer who wrote the Dictiounnaire Angllais-Guernésiais (English-Guernésiais dictionary), the first edition of which was published in 1967. This new work largely superseded George Métivier's Dictionnaire Franco-Normand.

Biography
Born in 1910 in Saint Peter, Guernsey, she published Folklore of Guernsey (1975) and the Glossary of Guernsey place-names. She served as president of La Société Guernesiaise and of L'Assembllaïe d'Guernesiais.

De Garis died in the early hours of 10 August 2010 after being admitted to the Princess Elizabeth Hospital in Saint Andrew, Guernsey.

Awards and honours
In 1999, de Garis received an MBE for her contributions to the preservation of Guernsey culture. She turned 100 in 2010.

References

External links
 Guernsey people

1910 births
2010 deaths
Women lexicographers
Guernsey centenarians
Members of the Order of the British Empire
Norman-language writers
Women centenarians